Arthur Milton Stokes (September 13, 1896 – June 2, 1962) was an American professional baseball player who pitched in twelve games for the Philadelphia Athletics during the  season. He was born in Emmitsburg, Maryland and died in Titusville, Pennsylvania at the age of 65.

External links

1896 births
1963 deaths
People from Emmitsburg, Maryland
Major League Baseball pitchers
Baseball players from Maryland
Philadelphia Athletics players